HEDP is an abbreviation for:

 High Explosive Dual Purpose anti-tank / fragmenting warhead
 Etidronic acid or etidronate
 High energy density physics
 the Higher Education Development Program of the Commission on Higher Education (Philippines)